KKCD (105.9 FM) is a radio station broadcasting a classic rock format. Licensed to Omaha, Nebraska, United States, the station serves the Omaha area.  The station is owned by SummitMedia. KKCD's studios are located on Mercy Road in Omaha's Aksarben Village, while its transmitter is located near South 27th Street and Q Street (near the Kennedy Freeway), about three miles south of Downtown Omaha.

History

Smooth jazz (1990-1991) 
The station went on the air on August 11, 1990, calling itself "The View" and broadcasting a smooth jazz format.  It had earlier sought the calls KUKF, but changed to KKVU a month before signing on.

Classic rock (1991-present) 
The station initially met acceptance, but soon struggled in the ratings, and on November 15, 1991, the station flipped formats to classic rock as "CD 105.9", and changed their call sign to KKCD. Notable radio personalities include: Donna Mason,TNT LATE NIGHT Otis XII and Steve King, who was the longest running morning show host in the station's history before he was fired February 1, 2019.

Journal Communications and the E. W. Scripps Company announced on July 30, 2014 that the two companies would merge to create a new broadcast company under the E.W. Scripps Company name that owned the two companies' broadcast properties, including KKCD. The transaction was completed in 2015. Scripps exited radio in 2018; the Omaha stations went to SummitMedia in a four-market, $47 million deal completed on November 1, 2018.

In February 2020, KKCD rebranded as simply "Classic Rock 105.9".

References

External links

KCD
Classic rock radio stations in the United States
Radio stations established in 1990
1990 establishments in Nebraska